The Sporting Chance is a 1925 American silent drama film directed by Oscar Apfel and starring Lou Tellegen, Dorothy Phillips, and George Fawcett.

Plot
As described in a film magazine review, when Darrell Thornton rejects the attentions of her wealthy Northerner admirer, she learns that her sweetheart, a Southerner, is in danger of having his race horse attached by the Sheriff for his debts. The Northerner is willing to keep the horse from being attached and keep the Southerner from jail if Miss Thornton will be his bride. She makes the promise to marry the Northerner. However, after the race horse has been smuggled onto the race track and hitched to an ice cream truck, it wins the race, recovering enough prize money to stay the debts. Patricia is now free to reject her suitor and marry the Southerner.

Cast

References

Bibliography
 Ken Wlaschin. Silent Mystery and Detective Movies: A Comprehensive Filmography. McFarland & Co., 2009.

External links

1925 films
Films directed by Oscar Apfel
American silent feature films
1920s English-language films
Tiffany Pictures films
American black-and-white films
American horse racing films
1920s sports drama films
American sports drama films
1925 drama films
1920s American films
Silent American drama films
Silent sports drama films